It'll Be Cool is the ninth and last full-length album released by indie rock band Silkworm before drummer Michael Dahlquist was killed in a car wreck. Released on September 14, 2004, it was the band's fourth album on Touch and Go Records. The album was recorded by Steve Albini. Matt Kadane from Bedhead and The New Year played keyboards on the album.

Track listing
Don't Look Back -- (6:25)
Insomnia -- (5:35)
Penalty Box -- (3:02)
Something Hyper -- (4:27)
Xian Undertaker -- (6:17)
Shitty Little Yacht -- (4:46)
The Operative -- (3:23)
His Mark Replies -- (2:28)

Personnel
Andy Cohen—Guitar, Vocals
Michael Dahlquist—Drums, Vocals, Guitar
Tim Midyett—Bass, Baritone Guitar, Vocals
Matt Kadane—Keyboards
Steve Albini—Engineer
J.J. Golden—Mastering

References

2004 albums
Silkworm (band) albums
Touch and Go Records albums
Albums produced by Steve Albini